Lovech Heights (‘Loveshki Vazvisheniya’ \'lo-vesh-ki v&-zvi-'she-ni-ya\) are the heights rising to 1634 m (Mount Moriya) on Nordenskjöld Coast in Graham Land, Antarctica.  They are extending 15.5 km in east-west direction and 9.7 km wide, and are bounded by Rogosh Glacier to the northwest and south, Zlokuchene Glacier to the northeast and Weddell Sea to the east.  Mrahori Saddle links the heights to Kyustendil Ridge to the north.

The feature is named after the city of Lovech in northern Bulgaria.

Location

British mapping in 1978.

Maps
 Antarctic Digital Database (ADD). Scale 1:250000 topographic map of Antarctica. Scientific Committee on Antarctic Research (SCAR). Since 1993, regularly upgraded and updated.

References
 Lovech Heights. SCAR Composite Antarctic Gazetteer.
 Bulgarian Antarctic Gazetteer. Antarctic Place-names Commission. (details in Bulgarian, basic data in English)

External links
Lovech Heights. Copernix satellite image

Ridges of Graham Land
Nordenskjöld Coast
Bulgaria and the Antarctic
Lovech